Vivienne Osborne (born Vera Vivienne Spragg; December 10, 1896 – June 10, 1961) was an American stage and film actress known for her work in Broadway theatre and in silent and sound films.

Career
Osborne began her career on stage when she was 5 years old, and by the time she was 18 years old, she had spent many years touring throughout Washington with a stock theater company. She made her Broadway debut in The Whirlwind (1919), and her screen debut in 1919 in a film that never was released. She continued work on Broadway, and appeared in films when not working theater.

Osborne's first silent film was in The Gray Brother, but the film did not have distribution and never was released. From March through December 1928, she appeared in the Florenz Ziegfeld musical version of The Three Musketeers. It was after her performance that Douglas Fairbanks Sr. offered her a role in The Iron Mask (1929), his last silent film, made as a sequel to his 1921 film The Three Musketeers. Rather than accept the offer, she chose to remain in New York City and continue her career. She signed with Paramount Studios in 1931 and was assigned to character roles, but left to sign with Warner Studios to get better roles. She then left Warners and signed a three-year contract with Radio Pictures. She alternated between film and stage roles for the rest of her career.

Of her work in the musical The Three Musketeers, Theatre Magazine wrote her voice was "of true operatic quality." Of her work as Mary Boyd in the 1931 film Husband's Holiday, Spokesman-Review wrote "Vivienne Osborne does fine work," and noted the several scenes which "tugged at the heartstrings" that were well done by Osborne and her co-star Juliette Compton.

Filmography
Silent films

 The Grey Brother (1919)
 In Walked Mary (1920) as Betsy Caldwell
 The Restless Sex (1920)
 Love's Flame (1920) as Adele De Ronsard
 Over the Hill to the Poorhouse (1920) as Isabella Strong
 The Right Way (1921) as The Sweetheart
 Mother Eternal (1921) as Julia Brennon
 Cameron of the Royal Mounted (1921) as Mandy Haley
 The Good Provider (1922) as Pearl Binswanger

Sound films

 Night Club (1929) as Herself
 Morgan's Maruders (1929)
 Masquerade (1931) 
 The Beloved Bachelor (1931) as Elinor Hunter
 Husband's Holiday (1931) as Mary Boyd
 Two Kinds of Women (1932) as Helen
 The Famous Ferguson Case (1932) as Mrs. Marcia Ferguson
 Two Seconds (1932) as Shirley Day
 Week-End Marriage (1932) as Shirley
 The Dark Horse (1932) as Maybelle Blake
 Life Begins (1932) as Mrs. McGilvary
 Men Are Such Fools (1932) as Lilli Arno
 Luxury Liner (1933) as Sybil Brenhard
 Sailor Be Good (1933) as Red Dale
 The Phantom Broadcast (1933) as Elsa Evans
 Supernatural (1933) as Ruth Rogen
 Tomorrow at Seven (1933) as Martha Winters
 The Devil's in Love (1933) as Rena Corday
 No More Ladies (1935) as Lady Diana Knowleton
 Let's Sing Again (1936) as Rosa Donelli
 Follow Your Heart (1936) as Gloria Forrester
 Wives Never Know (1936) as Renée La Journée
 Sinner Take All (1936) as Alicia MacKelvey
 Champagne Waltz (1937) as Countess Mariska
 The Crime Nobody Saw (1937) as Suzanne Duval
 She Asked for It (1937) as Celia Stettin
 Men Are Such Fools (1938) as Lili Arno
 Primrose Path (1940) as Thelma
 Captain Caution (1940) as Victorine Argandeau
 So You Won't Talk (1940) as Maxie Carewe
 I Accuse My Parents (1944) as Mrs. Wilson
 Dragonwyck (1946) as Johanna Van Ryn

Broadway theater
 Order Please (October 9, 1934 – October 1934) as Phoebe Weston
 As Good as New (November 3, 1930 – December 1930) as Mrs. Violet Hargrave
 The Royal Virgin (March 17, 1930 – March 1930) as The Countess of Rutland
 Week-End (October 22, 1929 – October 1929) as Marga Chapman
 The Three Musketeers (March 13, 1928 – December 15, 1928) as Lady De Winter
 One Glorious Hour (April 14, 1927 – May 1927) as Maria
 Fog (February 7, 1927 – May 1927) as Eunice
 ‘’The Harem’’ (June 1925) Replaced Lenore Ulric as Carla
 Aloma of the South Seas (April 20, 1925 – June 1925) as Aloma
 Houses of Sand (February 17, 1925 – March 1925) as Miss Kane
 The Blue Bandanna (June 23, 1924 - July 1924) as The Girl
 New Toys (February 18, 1924 – March 1924) as Ruth Webb
 Scaramouche (October 24, 1923 – December 1923) as Climene
 The Love Child (November 14, 1922 – April 1923) as Aline De Mar
 The Silver Fox (September 5, 1921 – December 1921) as Frankie Turner
 The Bonehead (April 12, 1920 – May 1920) as Jean Brent
 The Whirlwind'' (December 23, 1919 – February 1920) as Bessie Van Ashton

References

External links

 
 
 Vivienne Osborne at Find a Grave

1896 births
1961 deaths
American film actresses
American silent film actresses
Burials at Hollywood Forever Cemetery
Actresses from Des Moines, Iowa
American stage actresses
20th-century American actresses